The 5th Cavalry Division (5-ya Kavaleriiskaya Diviziya) was a cavalry formation of the Russian Imperial Army.

Organization
1st Cavalry Brigade
 Kargopol 5th Regiment of Dragoons
 Lithuanian 5th Uhlan Regiment
2nd Cavalry Brigade
 Alexandrian 5th Regiment of Hussars
 5th Regiment of Don Cossacks
 5th Horse Artillery Battalion

Commanders of the 1st Brigade
1910–1914: Aglay Dmitriyevich Kuzmin-Korovaev

References

Cavalry divisions of the Russian Empire
Military units and formations disestablished in 1918